Radical 164 or radical wine meaning "wine" or "alcohol" is one of the 20 Kangxi radicals (214 radicals in total) composed of 7 strokes.

In the Kangxi Dictionary, there are 290 characters (out of 49,030) to be found under this radical.

 is also the 153rd indexing component in the Table of Indexing Chinese Character Components predominantly adopted by Simplified Chinese dictionaries published in mainland China.

In Chinese astrology, 酉 represents the tenth Earthly Branch and corresponds to the Rooster in the Chinese zodiac.

Evolution

Derived characters

Literature

External links

Unihan Database - U+9149

164
153